Quzluy, also rendered as Qozlu, may refer to:
 Quzluy-e Afshar
 Quzluy-e Khaniyeh
 Quzluy-e Olya (disambiguation)
 Quzluy-e Sofla (disambiguation)

See also
 Quzlu (disambiguation)